The Sands International was a women's professional golf tournament on the Ladies European Tour held in England. It was played annually between 1983 and 1985 at Saunton Golf Club, near Braunton, North Devon.

Winners

Source:

References

External links
Ladies European Tour

Former Ladies European Tour events
Golf tournaments in England
Defunct sports competitions in England
Recurring sporting events established in 1983
Recurring sporting events disestablished in 1985